Westside School or simply Westside is a comprehensive school in the British territory of Gibraltar.

The school opened in 1982, and was built in order to provide education to the students of the former Girls' Comprehensive School, previously spread over three different sites, and itself an amalgamation of four girls' schools: Loreto High School, St. Joseph's Secondary School, St. Margaret's School, and St. David's Commercial School.

It was formerly only for girls, but as of 2021 is coeducational.

Subjects offered
Westside offers a range of subjects at different levels. These are at Key Stage 3 (years 7, 8 and 9), Key Stage 4 (years 10 and 11) and Sixth form (years 12 and 13). Students do their General Certificate of Secondary Education (GCSE) courses during Key Stage 4 and those who wish to further their studies from there, do their A-Levels during sixth form.
Italicized subjects indicate compulsory subjects.

Key Stage 3
Art and design
Drama
English
French
Geography
History
Information and communication technology
Mathematics
Music
Personal, social and health education
Physical education
Science
Spanish
Technology
Woodwork and home economics are also included

Key Stage 4
Art and design
Art and design (Textile)
Business studies
Child development
Child studies (non-GCSE)
Commercial studies (non-GCSE)
Economics
English language
English literature
Food and nutrition
French
Geography
History
Home craft (non-GCSE)
Information and communication technology

Mathematics
Music
Personal, Social and Health Education (non GCSE)
Physical Education
Religious Studies
Spanish
Combined science (formerly known as dual science)
Triple Science (added content to dual science)

Sixth form
Art and design
Biology
Business studies
Chemistry
Economics
English literature
French
Geography
History
History of art
Information and communication technology
Liberal studies (non A-Level)
Mathematics
Music
Physical education
Physics
Psychology (done in conjunction with the Gibraltar college on college premises*
Religious studies and philosophy
Religious studies (non A-level)

See also
Bayside Comprehensive School (Gibraltar)
List of schools in Gibraltar

Notes

Schools in Gibraltar
Secondary schools in British Overseas Territories
Educational institutions established in 1982
1982 establishments in Gibraltar
School buildings completed in 1982
Girls' schools in British Overseas Territories and Crown Dependencies